The 1999 season was AIK's 108th in existence. The team competed in the Allsvenskan and UEFA Champions League.

First-team squad

In

Results

Pre-season

Allsvenskan

UEFA Champions League

Group stage

References

AIK Fotboll seasons
AIK Fotboll season